The 2018 Milano–Torino was the 99th edition of the Milano–Torino cycling classic. The race was rated as a 1.HC event on the 2018 UCI Europe Tour.

Teams
Twenty-one teams, which consisted of 15 of the 18 UCI WorldTour teams and six UCI Professional Continental teams, of up to seven riders started the race:

UCI WorldTeams

 
 
 
 
 
 
 
 
 
 
 
 
 
 
 

UCI Professional Continental Teams

Results

References

2018 UCI Europe Tour
2018 in Italian sport
Milano–Torino